Bikelahoma (previously known as Bikes and Bulls) is an annual motorcycle rally held in Pryor, Oklahoma. 2008 was the birth of Bikelahoma in this format, featuring Jackyl, Kentucky Headhunters, Crooked X, Bang Tango, Dirty Penny, Murphy's Lawmen, Pedal Point and many other events alongside the rally.

References

External links 
 www.bikelahoma.com

Music venues in Oklahoma
Rock festivals in the United States
Motorcycle rallies in the United States
Tourist attractions in Mayes County, Oklahoma
Recurring events established in 2008